Rush to the Dead Summer is a 2017 Chinese television series based on Guo Jingming's novel of the same name; starring Chen Xuedong, Zheng Shuang and Bai Jingting. The series aired on Hunan TV from 11 June to 8 July 2017.

The drama was praised for its realistic portrayal of youth and campus life, as well as its beautiful cinematography.

Synopsis
This is a youthful story which spans the period of ten years and focuses on friendship, alienation, and one ultimate betrayal that breaks the group of close friends, each going their own way and entering society.

Despite growing up poor, Li Xia works hard and wins a scholarship into Qian Chuan secondary school where she meets Fu Xiaosi and Lu Zhiang, two boys who are the most popular in their batch. Fu Xiaosi possesses a cold demeanor  while Lu Zhiang is charismatic and easy-going. Li Xia also becomes friends with Yu Jian, a tomboy, and Cheng Qiqi, a rich girl.

Love booms in more ways than one, and the group of youth quickly became good friends. After graduation, everyone goes their separate ways. Fu Xiaosi becomes a well-known artist, and Li Xia becomes Xiaosi's assistant and other half. Cheng Qiqi won a singing competition and becomes a famous idol, and Yu Jian heads interstate to realize her dreams of becoming a singer. Everyone is still fighting for their dreams.

However, with the onslaught of adversities: the death of Lu Zhiang's mother and his imprisonment, Cheng Qiqi's betrayal and Li Xia's eventual departure, and Yu Jian's loss; the warm and bright summer starts to fade away. Everyone is changing and they become doubtful about the origin of their friendship. A span of ten years make them realize that other than memories, nothing can be eternal, but they learnt to love and grow.

Cast

Main

Supporting

Qian Chuan Secondary

Others

Production
The actors' original voices are used in this drama, with no dubbing. Filming began on August 5, 2016 at Guankou Middle School and ended on November 24. Guo Jingming acts as the artistic director of this series.

Soundtrack

Ratings

 Highest ratings are marked in red, lowest ratings are marked in blue

References

Chinese romance television series
Adaptations of works by Guo Jingming
Hunan Television dramas
2017 Chinese television series debuts
Chinese high school television series
Television series by Croton Media
Television shows based on Chinese novels